Uendi Vecaj (born 18 February 1997), is an Albanian professional footballer who plays as a right winger for KF Burreli.

Club career

Early career

Dinamo Zagreb
On 31 August 2017 Vecaj completed a transfer to Croatian First Football League giants GNK Dinamo Zagreb.

International career
He received his first international level call up to the Albania national under-21 team by coach Redi Jupi for the 2017 UEFA European Under-21 Championship qualification closing match against Israel U21 on 10 October 2016. He debuted for the under-21 national side against Israel U21 playing as a starter until half time where he was replaced by Ardit Hoxhaj in a 4–0 loss.

Career statistics

Club

Personal life
He is a cousin of Stivi Vecaj, also a football player. In February 2016 they were both omitted from their squads due to a blood feud after a remote family member killed a member from another family.

References

1997 births
Living people
Footballers from Shkodër
Albanian footballers
Albania under-21 international footballers
Association football forwards
KF Vllaznia Shkodër players
KF Teuta Durrës players
KF Laçi players
KS Burreli players
Kategoria Superiore players
Kategoria e Dytë players
Albanian expatriate footballers
Expatriate footballers in Croatia
Albanian expatriate sportspeople in Croatia